The 2019 Canadian federal election in Ontario was held on Monday, October 21 across 121 electoral districts within Ontario, as part of the 2019 Canadian federal election.

Results

Summary results

Analysis 
The Liberals retained a majority of seats in Ontario, with a net decrease of 1 seat. Of the Liberal Seats lost, only 1, Aurora—Oak Ridges—Richmond Hill was within the Greater Toronto Area.

The Conservatives made small seat gains, but lost support in the GTA, with the Deputy Leader of the Opposition Lisa Raitt losing her seat of Milton.

The New Democrats remained similar in vote share to 2015, with the party losing 2 Seats in Essex County, Ontario, Windsor—Tecumseh and Essex.

The Green Party increased its share of the vote but failed to make any gains. They placed second in the ridings of Guelph and Kitchener Centre.

References 

2019 Canadian federal election
Canadian federal elections in Ontario